SS Bebatik was the lead ship of the seven B-class LNG tankers. She was also known previously as Gadinia. She is named after the bebatik, a species of fish found in Brunei and Malaysia.

Development 
B-class LNG carriers were built by CNIM-La Syne, France in 1972 to 1975. They served Gaz de France for around 14 years, the B-Class vessels were acquired and delivered to BST in December 1986. Previously referred to as the G-class vessels chartered under Shell Tankers United Kingdom (STUK). They continued to provide reliable service to the company and its client especially BLNG. Four out of the seven BST vessels are manned by a fully Bruneian crew with the exception of senior management; a feat yet to be achieved but not impossible.

All B-class LNG tankers were decommissioned in 2011. They are all steam powered.

Construction and career 
SS Gadinia was ordered in 1972 and completed in the same year. The vessel entered service in 1972 and was taken out of service to be sold in 1986. In 1986, Brunei Shell acquired Gadinia and renamed her Bebatik. Throughout her career she routinely traveled between Brunei and Japan carrying LNG.

On 28 April 2018, she was taken out of service and scrapped in Shanghai, China after 45 years of service. She was among  the last two in service.

An art of her was drawn on one of the walls in the Billionth Barrel Monument.

References 

Ships of Brunei
Ships built in France
1971 ships